Japa (or japam) means repeating or remembering a mantra (or mantram), and ajapa-japa (or ajapajapam) means constant awareness of the mantra, or of what it represents. The letter A in front of the word japa means without (it should be understood, that ajapa means "no chanting", thus ajapa means to stop thinking about anything material, and japa means to think about Paramatma, God instead of thinking of maya). Thus, ajapa-japa is the practice of japa without the mental effort normally needed to repeat the mantra (effort is necessary for those who are not pure enough to dedicate themselves completely to God, and still have material desires, which is the cause of repeated reincarnation in samsara ocean). In other words, it has begun to come naturally, turning into a constant awareness. 

Says Swami Satchidananda:

References

Hindu philosophical concepts
Hindu prayer and meditation